KDNK (88.1 FM) is a community access station broadcasting an eclectic  format of music and local news in western Colorado in the United States. The station serves Carbondale, Aspen, Glenwood Springs, and other parts of the Roaring Fork Valley and beyond through its main transmitter and a series of mountain-top translators stretching from Vail to Leadville. The station is owned by Carbondale Community Access Radio, Inc.

Station history 
The original idea for KDNK came from Lee Swidler, who placed an ad in the local newspapers looking for volunteers to help start a community radio station. Among the first to volunteer were Bruce Stolbach, Bill Phillips, Brian Vancil, Jim Groh, Brenda Jochems, Pat Noel, Wick Moses, and Marple Lewis, who met in Swidler's locksmith shop at night to plan their strategy. Using an NTIA grant and money pledged by local residents, KDNK took to the air on April 15, 1983. Today, the station has a small paid staff and 100 volunteer program hosts.

Low powered translators 
In addition to its main signal, KDNK radio also has low-powered translators throughout western Colorado.

See also
List of community radio stations in the United States

External links

DNK
Community radio stations in the United States
NPR member stations
Radio stations established in 1983